Dominador Gómez (born José María Dominador Vicente Gregorio Gómez de Jesús; November 4, 1866 – May 14, 1930) was a Filipino ilustrado nationalist, physician, legislator, and a labor leader. 

Gomez was born in Intramuros, Manila. He was a nephew of Father Mariano Gomez, one of the three secular priests (collectively known in history as the Gomburza) who were executed in 1872 after being falsely accused of orchestrating the Cavite mutiny. In 1881, he obtained his bachelor's degree from Ateneo Municipal. He then took medicine in the University of Santo Tomas, but left for Spain in 1887 to continue his studies. In Spain, he got his license to practice medicine from the University of Barcelona in 1889 and then went to Madrid to get his doctorate. During this time, he was an active member of the propaganda movement. He was a leading member of the Asociacion Hispano-Filipina and a contributor to La Solidaridad. He used the pen name Ramiro Franco.

After being based in Spain, the "flamboyant Spanish mestizo and propagandist" returned to the Philippines six months after the return of fellow ilustrado Isabelo de los Reyes. He succeeded de los Reyes as the head of the Union Obrera Democratica in February 1903. Under his leadership, the UOD launched strikes against American companies in Manila. He was known for delivering fiery speeches against capitalism and imperialism. However, his leadership came to an abrupt halt when he was arrested on May 1, 1903, under charges of sedition and illegal association. The UOD was also accused of aiding the anti-US resistance of Filipino revolutionary Macario Sakay. Following the arrest, Gómez resigned from his position in the UOD. He was sentenced for four years of imprisonment and a year of hard labor, but he was able to gain early freedom by agreeing to help in the negotiations for Sakay's surrender to the American Insular Government in 1906.

After Sakay's surrender, he engaged in the parliamentary arena and was elected in the Philippine Assembly from the city of Manila's 1st district in  1907. He was expelled from office in 1908 but later won in the special election in March of the same year, finally only to resign later. He ran for re-election in 1909, only to be declared in 1911 as the true winner as Justo Lukban's election was voided due to his lack of residency. He would serve his term until 1912.

In popular culture
 Portrayed by Nanding Josef in the 1993 film, Sakay.
 Portrayed by Lorenzo Mara in the 2012 film, El Presidente.
Portrayed by JV Ibesate in Tanghalang Pilipino's 2017 Rock Sarswela, Aurelio Sedisyoso.

References

Sources
 William J. Pomeroy. The Philippines: Colonialism, Collaboration, and Resistance.
 Alfred W. McCoy. Policing America's Empire

1866 births
1930 deaths
Filipino nationalists
Filipino propagandists
Filipino socialists
Filipino trade unionists
People from Intramuros
20th-century Filipino medical doctors
Ateneo de Manila University alumni
University of Santo Tomas alumni
University of Barcelona alumni
Members of the Philippine Legislature
Members of the House of Representatives of the Philippines from Manila
Members of the Philippine Independent Church
Nacionalista Party politicians
Labor in the Philippines